

Incumbents
 President: John Dramani Mahama
 Vice President: Kwesi Amissah-Arthur
 Chief Justice: Georgina Wood

Predicted and Scheduled Events

August
August 5–21 - 1 Athletes from Ghana competed at the 2016 Summer Olympics in Rio de Janeiro, Brazil.

See also
Ghana at the 2016 Summer Olympics

References

 
2010s in Ghana
Years of the 21st century in Ghana